2,5-Dimethoxy-4-ethoxyamphetamine (MEM) is a psychedelic drug of the phenethylamine and amphetamine chemical classes. It was first synthesized by Alexander Shulgin. In his book PiHKAL, he lists the active dose range as 20–50 mg, and the duration as 10–14 hours. According to Shulgin, MEM produces color enhancement, visual phenomena, and pattern movement, among other effects.

MEM possesses affinity (Ki) for the 5-HT2A (3,948 nM), 5-HT2B (64.5 nM), 5-HT7 (7,156 nM), and σ1 (5,077 nM) receptors. It behaves as a partial agonist at the 5-HT2A receptor. MEM is relatively selective for these sites and displays low/negligible (> 10,000 nM) affinity for a wide array of other targets.

See also 
 2,5-Dimethoxy-4-substituted amphetamines

References

External links 
 MEM entry in PiHKAL
 MEM entry in PiHKAL • info

5-HT2B agonists
Substituted amphetamines
2,5-Dimethoxyphenethylamines